The Corey Causeway is a series of three twin-span bridges that cross the Boca Ciega Bay, part of the Gulf Intracoastal Waterway. The causeway carries SR 693. The two east bridges are fixed bridges, and the west bridge is a double-leaf bascule bridge. It connects the barrier islands of St. Pete Beach and the mainland of South Pasadena, Florida. The westbound span of the Corey Causeway was built in 1966, and the eastbound span was built in 1975, which replaced the original causeway built in the 1930s.

References

See also 
Dunedin Causeway
Clearwater Memorial Causeway
Sand Key Bridge
Belleair Causeway
Indian Rocks Causeway
Park Boulevard Bridge
Tom Stuart Causeway
John's Pass Bridge
Treasure Island Causeway
Pinellas Bayway

Bridges in Florida